Fate's Turning is a 1911 short silent drama film directed by D. W. Griffith, starring Charles H. West and featuring Stephanie Longfellow.

Cast
 Charles H. West - John Lawson, Jr.
 Stephanie Longfellow - his fiancee
 Grace Henderson - Grace's mother
 Dorothy Bernard - Mary, a waitress
 Donald Crisp - a valet
 Adolph Lestina - minister
 Francis J. Grandon - doctor
 Edward Dillon - attorney
 J. Jiquel Lanoe - attorney
 Kate Toncray - servant
 Elmer Booth - servant
 Claire McDowell - at hotel & at wedding
 Alfred Paget - at hotel
 Jack Pickford - at hotel
 John T. Dillon - at hotel
 Edwin August - at wedding
 Marion Sunshine - at wedding
 Alfred Paget - at wedding
 Guy Hedlund - at wedding

See also
 D. W. Griffith filmography

References

External links

1911 films
1911 drama films
American silent short films
Silent American drama films
American black-and-white films
Films directed by D. W. Griffith
1911 short films
1910s American films